This is an article showing the matches of Deportivo de La Coruña in European competitions.

Overall record
Accurate as of 8 August 2017

Source: UEFA.comPld = Matches played; W = Matches won; D = Matches drawn; L = Matches lost; GF = Goals for; GA = Goals against; GD = Goal Difference.

Results

External links

 Official website 
 Deportivo de La Coruña at La Liga 
 Deportivo de La Coruña at UEFA 

Europe
Spanish football clubs in international competitions